Anna Karenina is a 2013 Philippine television drama series broadcast by GMA Network. The series is based on a 1996 Philippine television series of the same title. Directed by Gina Alajar and Gil Tejada Jr., it stars Krystal Reyes, Barbie Forteza and Joyce Ching. It premiered on June 3, 2013 on the network's Telebabad line up replacing Indio. The series concluded on September 20, 2013 with a total of 80 episodes. It was replaced by Kahit Nasaan Ka Man in its timeslot.

Cast and characters

Lead cast
 Krystal Reyes as Anna Karenina "Anna" Serrano / Elisa Caluya / Anna Karenina "Anna" Monteclaro
 Barbie Forteza as Anna Karenina "Karen" Zamora / Anna Karenina "Karen" Villarama
 Joyce Ching as Anna Karenina "Nina" Fuentebella / Anna Karenina "Nina" Barretto

Supporting cast
 Sandy Andolong as Carmela Cruz-Monteclaro
 Juan Rodrigo as Xernan Monteclaro
 Valerie Concepcion as Ruth Monteclaro-Barretto
 Neil Ryan Sese as Abel Barretto
 Derrick Monasterio as Aldrin Monteclaro Barretto
 Hiro Peralta as Brian Manahan
 Julian Trono as Brix Manahan
 Yasmien Kurdi as Margarita "Maggie" Monteclaro
 Ana Roces as Dahlia "Daisy" Manahan
 Maybelyn Dela Cruz as Anaida "Nayda" Serrano
 Maureen Larrazabal as Suzana "Suzie" Zamora-Isidro
 Alicia Mayer as Bridgette Cruz-Fuentebella
 Jhoana Marie Tan as Carla Monteclaro Barretto
 Kathleen Hermosa as Rebecca “Becky” Serrano
 Allan Paule as Lucas Fuentebella
 Yul Servo as Ricardo “Kadyo” Isidro

Guest cast
 Thea Tolentino as Maria Angela "Angel" dela Cruz / fake Anna Karenina Monteclaro
 Isabel Granada as Alona Villarama
 Gabriel Roxas as Dindo / Dindi
 Chromewell Prince Cosio as Peter Calzado
 Dino Guevarra as Andres dela Cruz / fake Brent Dizon
 Mymy Davao as Onay
 Rhen Escaño as Geleen
 Nicole Dulalia as Candice
 Yassi Pressman as Jenna Vera
 Teejay Marquez as Benjie
 Alicia Alonzo as Zenaida "Zeny" Cervantes
 Sunshine Dizon as Perlita Mendoza, a crossover character from Mundo Mo'y Akin
 Shermaine Santiago as Glenda Caluya
 Aifha Medina as Rochelle

Ratings
According to AGB Nielsen Philippines' Mega Manila household television ratings, the pilot episode of Anna Karenina earned a 22.5% rating. While the final episode scored a 34.3% rating.

References

External links
 

2013 Philippine television series debuts
2013 Philippine television series endings
Filipino-language television shows
GMA Network drama series
Philippine teen drama television series
Television series about teenagers
Television series reboots
Television shows set in the Philippines